Muḥammad ibn Abī Bakr (631–657), was the youngest son of the first Islamic caliph Abu Bakr. His mother was Asma bint Umais, who was a widow of Ja'far ibn Abi Talib prior to her second marriage with Abu Bakr. He became the stepson of the fourth caliph Ali, and became one of his generals. He was one of the main figures in rebellion against Uthman and was actively involved in siege of his house which resulted in caliph's death.

Life  
 
He was a son of Abū Bakr from his marriage with Asma bint Umays. When Abu Bakr died, Asma bint Umais married Ali ibn Abi Talib. Muhammad ibn Abi Bakr had a son named Qasim ibn Muhammad ibn Abi Bakr. Qasim ibn Muhammad ibn Abi Bakr's wife was called Asma and she was the daughter of Abd al-Rahman ibn Abi Bakr who was Abu Bakr's other son. The daughter of Qasim ibn Muhammad ibn Abi Bakr and Asma was called Fatima (Umm Farwah).

After the Battle of Siffin, Ali ibn Abi Talib appointed Muhammad ibn Abi Bakr as the Governor of Egypt, then a newly conquered province of the Islamic empire. In 658 CE (38 AH), Mu'awiya ibn Abi Sufyan, the then Governor of Syria, sent his general Amr ibn al-As and six thousand soldiers against Muhammad ibn Abi Bakr. He hadn't proved himself to be a good governor, Lesley Hazleton writes "Muhammad AbuBakr – Aisha's half brother – had proved a weak governor. Ali himself ruefully acknowledged that he was "an inexperienced young man". Muhammad asked Imam Ali for help. Ali is said to have instructed his foster son to hand the governorship over to his best general and childhood friend, Malik al-Ashtar, whom he judged better capable of resisting Amr ibn al-As. However, Malik died on his way to Egypt. The Shi'a and Institute for Shia Ismaili Studies and London's Shi'aism researcher Wilferd Madelung believe that Malik was poisoned by Muawiyah I.

Ibn Abi Bakr was eventually defeated by 'Amr ibn al-'As. 'Amr's soldiers were ordered to capture him, bring him alive to Muawiyah I or kill him. A soldier named Mu'awiya ibn Hudayj is said to have quarreled with the prisoner and killed him out of hand. Ibn Hudayj was so incensed at Ibn Abi Bakr that he put his body into the skin of a dead donkey and burned both corpses together, so that nothing should survive of his enemy. However, Shi'a accounts say that the Muawiyah I who later became the first Umayyad Caliph was the actual killer of Ibn Abu Bakr. His grave is located in a mosque in Cairo, Egypt.

He had spent considerable time in Egypt and was part of the delegation that complained about the activities of the governor of Egypt to the third Caliph Uthman ibn Affan. The Caliph promised to immediately dismiss the Egyptian governor and replace him with Muhammad ibn Abu Bakr. However, after sensing betrayal from Uthman ibn Affan (but actually perpetrated by Marwan ibn al-Hakam) against the Muslim petitioners from Egypt, Muhammad ibn Abu Bakr rushed back with the petitioners to Medina where he initially took part in the uprising against Uthman ibn Affan. After realizing his error in getting involved in the Assassination of Uthman, he repented and withdrew from the uprising, although he had already led the group of rebels inside Uthman ibn Affan's residence.

The history is related as follows:

A group of seven hundred Egyptians came to complain to Caliph Uthman ibn Affan about their governor Ibn Abi Sarh's tyranny, so Uthman ibn Affan said: "Choose someone to govern you." They chose Muhammad ibn Abu Bakr, so Uthman ibn Affan wrote credentials for him and they returned. On their way back, at three days' distance from Madinah, a messenger caught up with them with the news that he carried orders from Uthman ibn Affan to the governor of Egypt. They searched him and found a message from Uthman ibn Affan to ibn Abi Sarh ordering the death of Muhammad ibn Abi Bakr and some of his friends. They returned to Madinah and besieged Uthman ibn Affan. Uthman ibn Affan acknowledged that the camel, the servant, and the seal on the letter belonged to him, but he swore that he had never written nor ordered the letter to be written. It was discovered that the letter had been hand-written by Marwan ibn al-Hakam.

Shi'a Muslim view

The Shi'a highly praise Muhammad ibn Abi Bakr for his devotion to ‘Ali and his resistance to the other rulers who were usurpers. Muhammad ibn Abi Bakr was a pious Muslim who supported the Imam of his time, Ali ibn Abi Talib, even though his sister Aisha opposed ‘Ali in the battle of Jamal, Ibn Abu Bakr was faithful to his stepfather. And he was in Ali's army in the Battle of Jamal and later it was Muhammad ibn Abi Bakr who escorted Aisha back to Madina. His grand daughter Fatima (Umm Farwah) was wife of Imam Muhammad al-Baqir. Thus Shi'a Imam after Imam Muhammad al-Baqir were his descendants from the mother side, starting with the great legal doctor of the Shi'a, Hanafi and Maliki Sunnis, Imam Ja'far al-Sadiq.

According to a Shi'a Muslim author:

‘Ali loved Muhammad Ibn Abi Bakr as his own son and his death was felt as another terrible shock. ‘Ali prayed for him, and invoked God's blessings and mercy upon his soul.

Openly opposed Mu'awiya

Both of Abu Bakr's sons Abd al-Rahman ibn Abi Bakr and Muhammad ibn Abi Bakr openly opposed Mu'awiya.

The appointment of Yazid was unpopular in Medina. Sahih Al Bukhari Volume 6, Book 60, Number 352, Narrated by Yusuf bin Mahak:

Marwan had been appointed as the governor of Hijaz by Mu'awiya. He delivered a sermon and mentioned Yazid bin Mu'awiya so that the people might take the oath of allegiance to him as the successor of his father (Mu'awiya). Then ‘Abd al-Rahman ibn Abi Bakr told him something whereupon Marwan ordered that he be arrested. But ‘Abd al-Rahman entered 'Aisha's house and they could not arrest him. Marwan said, "It is he (‘Abd al-Rahman) about whom Allah revealed this Verse: 'And the one who says to his parents: 'Fie on you! Do you hold out the promise to me..?'" On that, 'Aisha said from behind a screen, "Allah did not reveal anything from the Qur'an about us except what was connected with the declaration of my innocence (of the slander)."

Ibn Kathir wrote in his book the Al-Bidayah wan-Nihayah
that "in the year 56 AH Mu'awiya called on the people including those within the outlying territories to pledge allegiance to his son, Yazid, to be his heir to the Caliphate after him. Almost all the subjects offered their allegiance, with the exception of Abd al-Rahman ibn Abu Bakr (the son of Abu Bakr), Abd Allah ibn Umar (the son of Umar), al-Husayn bin Ali (the son of Ali), Abd Allah ibn al-Zubayr (The grandson of Abu Bakr) and Abd Allah ibn Abbas (Ali's cousin). Because of this Mu'awiya passed through Medina on his way back from Mecca upon completion of his Umrah Pilgrimage where he summoned each one of the five aforementioned individuals and threatened them. The speaker who addressed Mu'awiya sharply with the greatest firmness amongst them was Abd al-Rahman ibn Abu Bakr as-Siddiq, while Abd Allah ibn Umar ibn al-Khattab was the most soft-spoken amongst them.

Their sister Asma bint Abi Bakr was just as outspoken. Asma's son, Abd Allah, and his cousin, Qasim ibn Muhammad ibn Abi Bakr, were both grandsons of Abu Bakr and nephews of Aisha. When Husayn ibn Ali was killed in Karbala, Abd Allah, who had been Husayn's friend, collected the people of Mecca and made the following speech:

O people! No other people are worse than Iraqis and among the Iraqis, the people of Kufa are the worst. They repeatedly wrote letters and called Imam Husayn to them and took bay'at (allegiance) for his caliphate. But when Ibn Ziyad arrived in Kufa, they rallied around him and killed Imam Husayn who was pious, observed the fast, read the Quran and deserved the caliphate in all respects.

After his speech, the people of Mecca also joined Abd Allah to take on Yazid. When he heard about this, Yazid had a silver chain made and sent to Mecca with the intention of having Walid ibn Utba arrest Abd Allah ibn al-Zubayr with it. In Mecca and Medina Husayn's family had a strong support base, and the people were willing to stand up for them. Husayn's remaining family moved back to Madina. Eventually Abd Allah consolidated his power by sending a governor to Kufa. Soon Abd Allah established his power in Iraq, southern Arabia, the greater part of Syria and parts of Egypt.

Yazid tried to end Abd Allah's rebellion by invading the Hejaz, and he took Medina after the bloody Battle of al-Harra followed by the siege of Mecca. But his sudden death ended the campaign and threw the Umayyads into disarray, with civil war eventually breaking out. This essentially split the Islamic empire into two spheres. After the Umayyad civil war ended, Abd Allah lost Egypt and whatever he had of Syria to Marwan I. This, coupled with the Kharijite rebellions in Iraq, reduced his domain to only the Hejaz.

Abd Allah ibn al-Zubayr was finally defeated by Abd al-Malik ibn Marwan, who sent Al-Hajjaj ibn Yusuf. Hajjaj was from Ta'if, as were those who had killed Husayn. In his last hour, Abd Allah asked his mother Asma what he should do. Asma replied to her son:
 
You know better in your own self that if you are upon the truth and you are calling towards the truth go forth, for people more honourable than you were killed and have been killed, and if you are not upon the truth, then what an evil son you are, you have destroyed yourself and those who are with you. If you say what you say, that you are upon the truth and you will be killed at the hands of others then you will not truly be free, for this is not the statement of someone who is free... How long will you live in this world, death is more beloved to me than this state you are on, this state of weakness.

Then Abd Allah said to his mother after she had told him to go forth and fight: "I am afraid I will be mutilated by the people of Sham. I am afraid that they will cut up my body after they have killed me." She said: "After someone has died, it won't make any difference what they do to you if you have been killed." Abd Allah said to his mother:

I did not come to you except to increase myself in knowledge. Look and pay attention to this day, for verily, I am a dead man. Your son never drank wine, nor was he fornicator, nor did he wrong any Muslim or non-Muslim, nor was he unjust. I am not saying this to you to show off or show how pure I am but rather as an honour to you.
 
Abd Allah then left by himself on his horse to take on Hajjaj. Hajjaj's army defeated Abd Allah on the battlefield in 692. He beheaded him and crucified his body. He said, "No one must take down his body except Asma. She must come to me and ask my permission, and only then will his body be taken down." Asma refused to go and ask permission to take down her son's body. It was said to her, "If you don't go, his body will remain like that." She said, "Then let it be." Eventually Hajjaj came to her and asked, "What do you say about this matter?" She replied, "Verily, you have destroyed him and you have ruined his life, and with that you have ruined your hereafter."

The defeat of Abd Allah ibn al-Zubayr re-established Umayyad control over the Empire.

See also
Muhammad (name)
Ali
Abu Bakr (name)
Abd al-Rahman ibn Abi Bakr
Abd Allah ibn Abi Bakr
Aisha
Asma bint Abi Bakr
Siddiqui
Bodla
Qallu
Sheekhaal

References 

Wilferd Madelung, The Succession to Muhammad, Cambridge University Press, 1997.

Further reading

External links 
Biography
http://www.livingislam.org/n/shb_e.html - "Nevertheless, he brought in those who killed [Uthman]!"
https://sabazius.oto-usa.org/mohammed/ - Uthman became quite unpopular, and he was murdered by insurgents led by the son of Abu Bakr, Muhammad ibn Abi Bakr, in 656 e.v

631 births
658 deaths
7th-century Arabs
7th-century Egyptian people
Abu Bakr family
Children of Rashidun caliphs
Rashidun governors of Egypt
Assassinated politicians
Egyptian people who died in prison custody